Jeffrey Eugene Tam (born August 19, 1970) is an American former professional baseball player. He played in Major League Baseball as a right-handed pitcher from 1998 to 2003 for the New York Mets, Cleveland Indians, New York Mets, Oakland Athletics and the Toronto Blue Jays.

Early years and college career
Tam attended Eau Gallie High School in Melbourne, Florida where he played second base and was a teammate of Toronto Blue Jays draft pick Mark Fuller. In 1991, Tam led the Florida Space Coast Baseball League (Stan Musial Division) in hits and runs batted in while playing for the Melbourne Bombers. He then played college baseball for the Florida State Seminoles baseball team under head coach Mike Martin, before being signed as an undrafted free agent by the New York Mets in the 1993 MLB Draft.

Professional career
Tam made his Major League debut with the Mets in 1998 at the age of 27. He later pitched from 1999 through 2003 for the Cleveland Indians, Oakland Athletics and Toronto Blue Jays.

In a six-year career, Tam posted a 7-14 record with a 3.91 ERA and seven saves in 251 relief appearances. His most productive season came in 2000, when he appeared in 72 games and had a career-best ERA of 2.63. This time he was the top set-up man on an Oakland A's team that advanced to the playoffs.

Tam was a replacement player during the 1994 Major League Baseball strike. As a result, he was barred from membership in the Major League Baseball Players Association.

Tam last played professionally for the Bridgeport Bluefish of the independent Atlantic League in 2008.

In 2012, Tam was hired by Eastern Florida State College as head coach of its baseball team and director of its new intramural athletics program. Previously, Tam worked as pitching coach and chief assistant coach under Ernie Rosseau in 2011 and served as interim head coach after Rosseau retirement.

Personal life
Tam married Monica Oberle right after he got out of college and joined the MLB, in 2000 Tam had a daughter named Darian Tam, then in 2006 Tam had a daughter named Addison Tam. Tam and Monica are still together, and one child is in college while the other attends high school.

Sources

External links
, or Retrosheet, or Pelota Binaria

Personal Life: 
Wife: Monica Tam
Oldest Daughter: Darian Tam
Youngest Daughter: Addison Tam

1970 births
Living people
American expatriate baseball players in Canada
Atlantic League Road Warriors players
Binghamton Mets players
Bridgeport Bluefish players
Buffalo Bisons (minor league) players
Capital City Bombers players
Caribes de Anzoátegui players
Cleveland Indians players
Florida State Seminoles baseball players
Gulf Coast Mets players
Major League Baseball pitchers
Major League Baseball replacement players
Navegantes del Magallanes players
American expatriate baseball players in Venezuela
New York Mets players
Norfolk Tides players
Oakland Athletics players
Palm Springs Chill players
Pastora de los Llanos players
People from Melbourne, Florida
Pittsfield Mets players
Sacramento River Cats players
Sportspeople from Fullerton, California
St. Lucie Mets players
Syracuse SkyChiefs players
Toronto Blue Jays players